Keith MacLeod is a former Australian rules footballer, who played for the Fitzroy Football Club in the Victorian Football League (VFL).

Career
MacLeod played two games for Fitzroy in the 1979 season.

References

External links

1959 births
Living people
Fitzroy Football Club players
Koroit Football Club players
Australian rules footballers from Victoria (Australia)